The county governor of Hordaland county in Norway represented the central government administration in the county. On 1 January 2019, the office was merged with the county governor of Sogn og Fjordane into the county governor of Vestland.

The large Bergenhus stiftamt was established in 1660 by the king and it had several subordinate counties (amt) including Bergenhus amt. In 1662, a stiftamtmann was named for Bergenhus stiftamt (see List of Diocesan Governors of Bergen). Then in 1681, the first amtmann of Bergenhus county was named. In 1763, the northern part of the county was split off to become Nordre Bergenhus amt and the southern part that remained was renamed Søndre Bergenhus amt. The seat of the amt was at Bergen. In 1871, the city of Bergen was split off as a separate county. Bergen and Søndre Bergenhus counties shared a county governor from 1919-1972. In 1919, the Søndre Bergenhus county was renamed Hordaland. In 1972, Bergen county was merged back into Hordaland. In 2020, Hordaland and Sogn og Fjordane counties were merged into Vestland county.

The county governor is the government's representative in the county. The governor carries out the resolutions and guidelines of the Storting and government. This is done first by the county governor performing administrative tasks on behalf of the ministries. Secondly, the county governor also monitors the activities of the municipalities and is the appeal body for many types of municipal decisions.

Names
The word for county (amt or fylke) has changed over time as has the name of the county. From 1681 until 1762, the title was Amtmann i Bergenhus amt. From 1763 until 1918, the title was Amtmann i Søndre Bergenhus amt. From 1 January 1919 until 1 January 2019, the title was Fylkesmann i Hordaland fylke.

List of county governors
Hordaland county has had the following governors:

References

Hordaland